Nicholas Sims-Williams, FBA (born 11 April 1949, Chatham, Kent) is a British professor of the School of Oriental and African Studies (SOAS), University of London, where he is the Research Professor of Iranian and Central Asian Studies at the Department of the Languages and Cultures of Near and Middle East. Sims-Williams is a scholar who specializes in Central Asian history, particularly the study of Sogdian and Bactrian languages. He is also a member of the advisory council of the Iranian Studies journal.

Sims-Williams recently worked on a dedicatory Sogdian inscription, dated to the 1st–3rd centuries CE, that was discovered at Kultobe in Kazakhstan. It alludes to military operations of the principal towns of Sogdiana against the nomads in the north. The inscription tends to confirm the confederational organization of the Kangju state and its various allies that was known previously from the Chinese texts.

Publications

His published works include:

 "Sogdian and other Iranian inscriptions of the Upper Indus II", London (1992)
 "Bactrian ownership inscriptions" BAI 7, pp173–9 (1993)
 "New light on ancient Afghanistan: the decipherment of Bactrian", London (1997)
 "Bactrian documents from Northern Afghanistan I: Legal and economic documents" Oxford  (2000)
 "Recent discoveries in the Bactrian language and their historical significance", Society for the Preservation of Afghanistan's Cultural Heritage (Afghanistan). (2004)
 "Some Bactrian seal-inscriptions" in "Afghanistan, ancien carrefour entre l'est et l'ouest" BREPOLS 
 Nicholas Sims-Williams and Franz Grenet, The Sogdian Inscriptions of Kultobe, Shygys (Almaty), 2006, pp. 95–111.
 Nicholas Sims-Williams, Franz Grenet, and Alexandr N. Podushkin, Les plus anciens monuments de la langue sogdienne: les inscriptions de Kultobe au Kazakhstan, Compte-rendus de l’Académie des Inscriptions et Belles-Lettres, 2007 [2009] pp. 1005, 1025–1033.
 Nicholas Sims-Williams (ed.), Biblical and other Christian Sogdian texts from the Turfan Collection, Turnhout: Brepols, 2014.
 "A new Bactrian Inscription from the time of Kanishka." In: Kushan Histories: Literary Sources and Selected Papers from a Symposium at Berlin, December 5 to 7, 2013. Edited by Harry Falk. Hempen Verlag, Bremen (2015), pp. 255–264.

References

External links
Bactrian documents from Ancient Afghanistan
Nicholas Sims-Williams profile
Nicholas Sims-Williams MAHRS Profile

Academics of SOAS University of London
Iranologists
Members of the American Philosophical Society
Members of the French Academy of Sciences
Living people
1949 births
People from Chatham, Kent
Zoroastrian studies scholars
Fellows of the British Academy